Night Like This may refer to:

"Night Like This" (Crowder song), 2020
"Night Like This", a song by Shawn Desman from the album Fresh
"Night Like This", a song by Hilary Duff from the album Breathe In. Breathe Out.
"Night Like This", a song by LP from the album Forever for Now

See also
Nights Like This (disambiguation)
A Night Like This (disambiguation)